Journey Girls is an American line of 18" fashion dolls sold by Journey Girls. They are targeted at girls ages 6–12 and were sold at Toys R Us until it went out of business. JustPlay rereleased the Journey Girls, and they have been sold on Amazon since then.

Description
There were originally six main Journey Girls; Chavonne, Kelsey, Meredith, Callie, Kyla, and Dana, each with unique personalities. A seventh Journey Girl, Jordanna, was released as a special edition doll in late 2013 as part of the Paris collection. Toys R Us added another new Journey Girl doll, named Mikaella, for the Italy line, who had previously been released as the London holiday special edition doll in 2014. Likewise, the New York holiday doll, Ilee, became a member of the main group with the Australia line, after her original introduction in 2016. The Italy holiday doll, Giovanna was not rereleased after her initial release in 2015. The Australia and Japan holiday dolls have no name.

The top portion of their bodies are made of vinyl and the lower half is made of cloth. They have rooted hair and inset eyes. Journey Girls dolls come in a wide variety of skin tones, hair colors, and hair textures.

Chavonne, originally named Taryn, is African American; she is a leader and a singer. Kyla, originally named Alana, is Latina; she loves art, dreams of being a photographer, and is shy.  Meredith is blonde; she is very athletic and out spoken. Kelsey is a pale redhead; she is adventurous, dreams of being a writer, and can settle differences between her friends.  Dana is the only doll with glasses; she loves animals and is always trying to help at the local shelter. Her dream job is a veterinarian. Callie is biracial, of Japanese and Mexican descent; she loves to dance, and is the fashion guru of the group. Mikaella has strawberry blonde hair; she loves trying new things and cooking for her friends. She dreams of owning her own restaurant. Ilee has blonde hair with a darker blonde streak; she loves nature, is free- spirited, and dreams of being a florist.

Their clothes differentiate from doll to doll and come with a wide range of accessories. The Journey Girls dolls are released about once a year with a new outfit.  Each year they are realized with a different local in mind.  2013 was the Paris line; 2014 was the London line; 2015 saw the girls visiting Italy; in 2016 they went to New York; the line released in 2017 takes them to Australia; and after being rereleased in December they go to Japan.  Each line also includes outfits that correspond to the area that the girls are visiting.   There are also general accessories that are always available, such as a bike, a sleepover set, a travel set, bunk beds, and a wheelchair set. Fashion packs have also been released, and usually came with two unnamed dolls.  As of February 2023, the standard 8-doll line up remains the Japan-themed one, though the packaging has been changed over the intervening time to a combined shipper/box in matt brown cardboard with simple black, lavender and white printing and a removable glossy full colour card insert over the doll with a small square opening to show the face. In 2021, an additional doll, Alana, was added with a theme of a trip to Brazil. She uses the same facial sculpt as Chavonne, but has tawny/golden skin with some freckles, bright hazel-green eyes, and tawny, wavy hair with magenta streaks 

The Journey Girls dolls are 18 inches tall, similar to the American Girl dolls. The Journey Girls are slightly thinner than American Girl Dolls.  Journey Girls can wear most American Girl doll clothes, although they may be a little loose on them.  American Girl doll shoes, however, are too large for the smaller, narrower Journey Girl feet. This is especially true of pants, shorts, skirts and other clothing that is centered on the waist. American Girl Dolls usually cannot wear Journey Girls outfits.  The Journey Girls ranged from about $30-$40.

See also
American Girl

Fashion dolls